nProtect GameGuard Personal 2007 (often referred to as nProtect GGP2007) is an Anti-Virus security suite for Microsoft Windows 2000, XP, and Vista developed by INCA Internet for users playing online computer games. It includes real-time protection from most forms of malware, including viruses, trojans, spyware, worms, keyloggers, and rootkits, as well as a game optimization feature. Like many other security products, nProtect GameGuard Personal 2007 can cause collisions when executed with security products simultaneously. The collisions mainly occur when running the on-access scanning (real-time scanning) simultaneously.

nProtect GameGuard Personal 2007 is available both in a free and a non-free edition, the former lacking treatment abilities for some malware.

See also 

INCA Internet Co., Ltd.
nProtect GameGuard
Anti-Virus Software

References

External links
nProtect GameGuard official website

Antivirus software